Statistics of Southern New England Soccer League in season 1914-15.

League standings
                           GP   W   L   T  GF  GA   PTS
 New Bedford F.C.          16  10   1   5  42   9   25
 YMCTAS                    14   9   3   2  33  16   20
 J&P Coats                 14   7   2   5  29  16   19
 Pawtucket                 16   2  11   3  26  53    7
 Taunton City              16   2  13   1  12  48    5

References
Southern New England Soccer League (RSSSF)

1914-15
1914–15 domestic association football leagues
1914–15 in American soccer